The 1922 Coppa Italia was the 1st edition of the football championship. It began April 2 and ended July 16, 1922 with the victory of Vado, the only title in its history.

Prior to the events
Proposals for an Italian football cup were made many times before WWI, without followings. In 1921, all major clubs resigned from the FIGC to establish the first Football League of the country, so the FIGC decided to add a cup to its championship in response

The regulation of the first Coppa Italia was rather confusing starting with the number of teams admitted (37), which did not allow an easy match for the games to be played. To solve this problem it was necessary to proceed with several byes. Almost every formations were from Northern Italy, with Livorno being the southernmost city allowed to participate

With the victory of the outsider Vado enrolled in the Promozione , the Ligurians became the first to win the biggest national cup as well as to win it even though they did not play in the top division; the latter, a record later equaled by Naples alone in the 1961-1962 edition.

The cup was a poor tournament, without the most prestigious team and limited to Northern Italy, and even more many clubs involved in the championship finals retired from the cup to avoid distractions.

After the reunification between the Football Association and the Football League, the cup was no more organized for many years.

Participating teams
The teams retired from the competition before the first round are marked in italics.

Prima Categoria and Coppa Giulia

Promozione

First round
Treviso received a bye due to a drawing; Libertas Firenze and Pro Livorno received byes due to fixture congestion.

Second round
Libertas Firenze and Pro Livorno received byes due to fixture congestion.

Third round
Libertas Firenze, Novese, Pro Livorno and Speranza Savona received byes due to fixture congestion; Udinese received a bye due to the absence of competitors.

Quarter-finals

Semi-finals

Final

Top goalscorers

References 

rsssf.com

Coppa Italia seasons
Coppa Italia
Italia